Spanish Revolution may refer to:

 Revolt of the Comuneros, a popular uprising in Castile against Charles I
 Mutiny of Aranjuez, an uprising in 1808 against Charles IV that became a prelude to the French invasion of Spain
 Pronouncement of Lacy, a failed revolt by Francisco Milans del Bosch and Luis de Lacy against Ferdinand VII
 Trienio Liberal (1820–1823), the establishment of a liberal government in Spain and the restoration of the Constitution of 1812
 Spanish Revolution of 1854, also known as the Vicalvarada, a revolution in Madrid that began the Bienio progresista
 Glorious Revolution (Spain) (1868), a revolution against Queen Isabella II
 Petroleum Revolution (1873), a workers' revolution in Alcoy
 Cantonal rebellion (1873-1874), a cantonalist revolt to establish a federal republic from the bottom-up
 Proclamation of the Second Spanish Republic (1931)
 Anarchist insurrection of Alt Llobregat (1932)
 Anarchist insurrection of January 1933, a general strike for higher wages throughout Spain
 Anarchist insurrection of December 1933, a general strike to establish libertarian communism in Aragon
 Revolution of 1934, a revolutionary general strike in Asturias and Catalunya during the black biennium
 Spanish Civil War, a military uprising against the Second Spanish Republic
 Spanish Revolution of 1936, a workers' social revolution that coincided with the Spanish Civil War
 Spanish transition to democracy, the formal end of Francoist Spain and the reinstatement of parliamentarism